Castlecrag Mountain is a mountain located on Vancouver Island, British Columbia.  Castlecrag Mountain is located South of Moat Lake, 1.6 km West of Mount Frink along the same ridge line.

Castlecrag Mountain is often climbed as part of the Castlecrag - Mt. Frink loop.  This route starts at Circlet Lake, accessed from Paradise Meadows and the Mount Washington Alpine Resort.


History
The name Castlecrag Mountain comes from the appearance of the North aspect. The Geographic Board of the BC Geographic Names Office deemed Castle Crag too obscure, instead adopting Castlecrag Mountain in 1948.

See also
List of mountains in Strathcona Provincial Park

References

External links

One-thousanders of British Columbia
Vancouver Island Ranges
Comox Land District